Ceuthocarpus is a monotypic genus of flowering plants in the family Rubiaceae. The genus contains only one species, viz. Ceuthocarpus involucratus, which is endemic to Cuba.

References

External links 
 Ceuthocarpus in the World Checklist of Rubiaceae

Monotypic Rubiaceae genera
Chiococceae